Karschiola is a genus of tiger moths in the family Erebidae. It contains the single species, Karschiola holoclera, which is found in Malawi, Tanzania and Zimbabwe.

References

Natural History Museum Lepidoptera generic names catalog

Nyctemerina
Monotypic moth genera
Moths of Africa